Yelena Kosolapova (born 12 March 1937) is a Soviet diver. She competed in the women's 3 metre springboard event at the 1960 Summer Olympics.

References

1937 births
Living people
Russian female divers
Soviet female divers
Olympic divers of the Soviet Union
Divers at the 1960 Summer Olympics
Place of birth missing (living people)